Miss New Caledonia is a French beauty pageant which selects a representative for the Miss France national competition from the sui generis overseas collectivity of New Caledonia. The first Miss New Caledonia was crowned in 1952, although the pageant was not held regularly until 1980. Until 2007, the competition was known as Miss Caledonia.

The current Miss New Caledonia is Océane Le Goff, who was crowned Miss New Caledonia 2022 on 17 September 2022. One woman from New Caledonia has been crowned Miss France:
Pascale Taurua, who was crowned Miss France 1978, although she later resigned the title

Results summary
Miss France: Pascale Taurua (1977)
1st Runner-Up: Vahinerii Requillart (2007)
2nd Runner-Up: Nadine Guillerme (1980)
3rd Runner-Up: Gisèle Maui (1985)
6th Runner-Up: Emmanuelle Darman (2005); Mondy Laigle (2014)

Titleholders

Miss Caledonia
Until 2007, the pageant was known by the name Miss Caledonia.

Notes

References

External links

Miss France regional pageants
Beauty pageants in France
Women in New Caledonia